Lido Tikok is a census town in Tinsukia district in the Indian state of Assam.

Demographics
 India census, Lido Tikok had a population of 6761. Males constitute 54% of the population and females 46%. Lido Tikok has an average literacy rate of 66%, higher than the national average of 59.5%: male literacy is 74%, and female literacy is 57%. In Lido Tikok, 12% of the population is under 6 years of age.

References

Cities and towns in Tinsukia district
Tinsukia